The 1973 North Dakota State Bison football team was an American football team that represented North Dakota State University during the 1973 NCAA Division II football season as a member of the North Central Conference. In their first year under head coach Ev Kjelbertson, the team compiled a 8–2 record.

Schedule

References

North Dakota State
North Dakota State Bison football seasons
North Central Conference football champion seasons
North Dakota State Bison football